Kulberia is a census town in the Barasat I CD block in the Barasat Sadar subdivision in the North 24 Parganas district in the Indian state of West Bengal. It is a part of Kolkata Urban Agglomeration.

Geography

Location

Bamangachhi, Digha and Kulberia form a cluster of census towns. The entire cluster has a very high density of population. (See the infobox of each census town for density of population).

Duttapukur police station has jurisdiction over Barasat I CD Block.

Area overview
The area covered in the map alongside is largely a part of the north Bidyadhari Plain. located in the lower Ganges Delta. The country is flat. It is a little raised above flood level and the highest ground borders the river channels.54.67% of the people of the densely populated area lives in the urban areas and 45.33% lives in the rural  areas.

Note: The map alongside presents some of the notable locations in the subdivision. All places marked in the map are linked in the larger full screen map.

Demographics
 India census, Kulberia had a population of 6,993; of this, 3,543 are male, 3,450 female. It has an average literacy rate of 81.15%, higher than the national average of 74.04%.

Infrastructure

Transport
Local roads link Kulberia to Chhota Jagulia on National Highway 112 (Jessore Road).

The Bamangachhi railway station on the Sealdah-Bangaon line, which is part the Kolkata Suburban Railway railway system, is located nearby.

Healthcare
North 24 Parganas district has been identified as one of the areas where ground water is affected by arsenic contamination.

See also
Map of Barasat I CD Block on Page 393 of District Census Handbook.

References

Cities and towns in North 24 Parganas district